Intracoronary optical coherence tomography (OCT) (or, more generally, intravascular optical coherence tomography, IVOCT) is an endoscopic-based application of optical coherence tomography. Analogous to intravascular ultrasound, intracoronary OCT uses a catheter to deliver and collect near infrared light (e.g., 1,300 nm) to create cross-sectional images of the artery lumen and wall. Intracoronary OCT creates images at a resolution of approximately 15 micro-meters, an order of magnitude improved resolution with respect to intravascular ultrasound and X-ray coronary angiogram.

IVOCT visualization of arteries inner lumen can help physician to understand morphology and plan treatment accordingly. IVOCT has been used as guidance for angioplasty intervention of coronary arteries, including optimization of stent implantation.

Medical uses 
Data published in late 2016 showed that approximately 100,000 intracoronary optical coherence tomography procedures are performed every year, and its adoption is rapidly growing at a rate of ~ 20% every year.  Evidence showed that intracoronary OCT can be used to optimize percutaneous coronary intervention to treat myocardial infarction and that OCT imaging influence physician decision in > 50% of the cases.

Assessment of artery lumen morphology is the cornerstone of intravascular imaging criteria to evaluate disease severity and guide intervention. The high-resolution of OCT imaging allows to assess with high accuracy vessel lumen area, wall microstructure, intracoronary stent apposition and expansion. OCT has an improved ability with respect to intravascular ultrasound to penetrate and delineate calcium in the vessel wall that makes it well suited to guide complex interventional strategies in vessels with superficial calcification. OCT has the capability of visualize coronary plaque erosion and fibrotic caps overlying atheromas.

Safety
Safety of intravascular imaging, including intracoronary OCT and intravascular ultrasound, has been investigated by several studies. Recent clinical trials reported a very low rate of self-limiting, minor complications on over 3,000 patients where in all cases no harm or prolongation of hospital stay was observed. Intracoronary optical coherence tomography was demonstrated to be safe among heterogeneous groups of patients presenting varying clinical setting.

Methods
State-of-the-art intracoronary optical coherence tomography uses a swept-source laser to make OCT images at high-speed (i.e., approximately 80,000 kHz - A-scan lines per second) to complete acquisition of a 3D OCT volume of coronary segments in a few-seconds. The first intravascular FD-OCT was introduced to the market in 2009 (EU and Asia) and in 2012 (US). In 2018, two intracoronary OCT catheters are clinically available for use in the coronary arteries, having a size in diameter between 2.4F and 2.7F. The basic principle of FD-OCT, is the use of interferometric techniques to measure the time-of-flight of light, emitted and collected from the imaging catheter to create cross-sectional images of arterial lumen and vessel wall.

The axial resolution of state-of-the-art commercial systems is < 20 micrometers, which is decoupled from the catheter lateral resolution. The highest resolution of OCT allows for the in vivo imaging of vessel microstructural features at an unprecedented level, enabling visualization of vessel wall atherosclerosis, pathology, and interaction with therapeutic devices at a microscopic level.

See also
 Fractional flow reserve
 Intravascular ultrasound
 Intravascular fluorescence

References 

Vascular procedures
Optical coherence tomography
Medical imaging